Kumani may refer to:
 Kumani (supporter group), sports ultras from North Macedonia
 Kumani, Iran, a village in Iran
 Kuman, Albania, a village in Albania

See also 
 Kumans, a mediaeval ethnic group
 Kummanni, a Hittite city
 Kumane (disambiguation)
 Komani (disambiguation)
 Cumani (disambiguation)